Ambodiriana pimelioides is a species of beetle in the leaf beetle family. It is the only member of the genus Ambodiriana, and was first described by the Czech entomologist Jan Bechyné in 1953. Its type locality is Tamatave, Madagascar. It is apterous.

References

Eumolpinae
Beetles of Africa
Insects of Madagascar
Beetles described in 1953
Endemic fauna of Madagascar